Masood Ahmad Khan (Urdu: ‎; Masʻūd Ashʻar; 10 February 1930/1931 – 5 July 2021), better known as Masood Ashar, was a Pakistani Urdu short story writer, novelist, journalist, columnist  and translator. On 14 August 2009, he was awarded the Pride of Performance by the President of Pakistan. In 2015, he received Sitara-i-Imtiaz, third-highest civilian award of Pakistan.

Early life 
Masood Ashar was born on 10 February 1931, in Rampur, Uttar Pradesh, India. Ashar completed his early education from the Madrasa-i-Aliya in Rampur. He did his matriculation from Allahabad board in 1948 and did his graduation from Agra.

Career 
In 1951, Ashar migrated to Pakistan after completing his graduation and lived in Lahore and Multan where he worked for Zamindar, Daily Imroze, Roznama Ahsan and weekly Aasaar. In 1954 when he joined Urdu Daily Imroze as senior sub-editor then during that period Ahmed Nadeem Qasmi was the editor of Imroz. In 1958, Masood Ashar became the resident editor of Imroz, Multan.

In 1978, during Gen Zia’s dictatorial regime, when massacre at Multan Colony Textile Mills happened then Masood Ashar printed the news of the accident in Daily Imroze. As a punishment, he was transferred from Multan to Lahore. In 1983, he was sacked from his job when he signed a demand for revival of democracy in the country. In 1988, during the government of Benazir Bhutto, he was reinstated to his post and he retired from the newspaper, Daily Imroze as its editor. In 1992, he was associated with a publishing house called Mashal. He frequently visited literary gatherings of the Pak Tea House.

Works 
Masood Ashar had written several poems and short stories. In 1948, his first short story was published in Fasana, a journal from Allahabad. In 1964, after a long gap, he returned to writing short stories and his story was published in Savera. He wrote short stories, Ankhon Par Dono Hath in 1974, Saray Afsanay in 1987, Apna Ghar in 2004, Sawal Kahani in 2019. The Oxford University Press published Intikhab: Masood Ashar, a selection of Masood Ashar short stories which was edited by Asif Farrukhi.

As writer 

 Pakistani Adab-1993
 Bismillah Ka Gumbad

As translator 

 Zindagi Se Najat

Death 
Masood Ashar died in Lahore on 5 July 2021. He was buried in Lahore. Thousands of people  attended the funeral prayers of Masood Ashar including Atta-ul-Haq Qasmi and Asghar Nadeem Syed. He is survived by two sons and two daughters.

Pakistani Minister for Information and Broadcasting Fawad Chaudhry, Pakistan Academy of Letters chairman, Yousuf Khushk and Punjab Chief Minister Sardar Usman Bazdar expressed deep sorrow and grief. Working body of Arts Council of Pakistan also expressed deep sorrow and grief over the sad demise of Masood Ashar.

Awards 

 2009, Pride of Performance, by President of Pakistan.
 2015, Sitara-i-Imtiaz, third-highest civilian award of Pakistan.

External links 

 QUICKFIRE: ‘ABOUT ELEVEN’ QUESTIONS WITH MASOOD ASHAR

References 

1930s births
Year of birth uncertain
2021 deaths
Death in Lahore
Recipients of the Pride of Performance
Recipients of Sitara-i-Imtiaz
Pakistani people of Indian descent